Adam Davenport (born May 27, 1984 in Harvey, Illinois) is an American-Serbian actor, DJ, record producer, singer, songwriter and filmmaker. Davenport made his screen acting debut in Colombian filmmaker Esteban Uribe's Cleanse Pest, Rest as a transgender sex worker who becomes a victim of a hate crime. He has acted in several Off-Broadway productions, including Naked Boys Singing!, and appeared on several television shows, including the HBO series High Maintenance and the Starz series Sweetbitter.

Davenport received critical acclaim for his debut single "My Return Address Is You," which broke into the Top 40 of the Billboard Dance Club Chart, making him the first African-American artist/producer in history to eponymously chart on Billboard for EDM (electronic dance music). He was subsequently invited into the Recording Academy. In late 2018, Davenport released an EDM cover of Eric Clapton's "Change The World."

Background

Author
At 15, Davenport wrote a short story titled Home which was published in the anthology Looking Inward, for which he was presented with an Award of Achievement by former President George Bush, Sr. in 1999.  He is also a two-time National NAACP ACT-SO Competition gold medal winner for Colors of the Rainbow (2000) when he was a junior at Marian Catholic High School, and for Blood at the Root: The Legacy of Billy Holiday's Strange Fruit (2001) the following year

Davenport began writing screenplays as an undergraduate at Yale University where he studied filmmaking.

Career

Film 
Davenport's short film Midnight Son, which he made as his thesis project while an undergraduate at Yale University, became the recipient of the Panavision New Filmmaker Award, a distinction shared by the first films of Steven Soderbergh, Paul Thomas Anderson and Jared Hess.  Made by Davenport when he was twenty-one years old, the project was photographed by cinematographer Tom Stern and starred Academy Award winner Melissa Leo, Jack Mulcahy and Tony nominee David Harbour.

Midnight Son screened at the Clermont-Ferrand International Film Festival in France and "received much praise" for its direction and performances.

Davenport co-wrote a screenplay for a film adaptation of John Kaye's novel The Dead Circus with Kaye, but the project stalled in development due to the film's budget.

Acting
Davenport left Los Angeles and began to work as an actor in New York City, where he began to garner notice for his range of quirky, off-beat and eccentric character portrayals. Per Sally Kirkland, who mentored Davenport since his early days in Hollywood, "He is a character actor in a leading man's body"
.

At 27, Davenport became the youngest director accepted into the Actors Studio Playwright/Directors Unit; his interview was with Martin Landau and Mark Rydell. He made his New York stage debut in the opera adaptation of Tom Wolfe's "The Bonfire of the Vanities," directed by Michael Bergmann and opposite opera heavyweights Randal Turner, Adrienne Danrich and Anne-Carolyn Bird. In November 2016 he performed Morten Lauridsen's "Lux Aeterna" and the North American premiere of Howard Goodall's "Eternal Light: A Requiem" with an international choir at Carnegie Hall.

In 2016, Davenport became the first African-American actor to play Hercules onscreen when he was cast to play the mythic hero in Alex Ewen's musical feature film Project Olympus, produced by Road Warrior Entertainment.

Music 
In 2017, Davenport signed with the label Independent Ear and released his debut single "My Return Address is You," featuring Shanica Knowles, in late January 2017; the track was released internationally via Universal Music Group and entered the charts at #7 on Dance Mix USA for the week ending 2/11/17. He subsequently became the first African-American producer to eponymously chart on Billboard for Electronic Dance Music after the song charted on the Dance Club chart for 10 weeks, peaking at #23 on September 23, 2017.

Davenport has been an advocate for gay, black artists by opening discussions on the absence of African-American artists in EDM. Per Chill Magazine, "Multi-hyphenated artist Adam Davenport is bringing Black visibility into some of the most whitewashed worlds, including opera and EDM."

Future projects
In a December 2018 interview with Chill Magazine, Davenport revealed his plans to develop an original electronic dance musical for the stage. "I ultimately want to use electronic dance music as a narrative tool. Just as Lin-Manuel Miranda used hip-hop beautifully to advance storytelling on the stage, I have my own story called Weekend Warriors that I’d like to tell on the stage with electronic dance music. I’m willing to do everything myself—write the book, produce the music, DJ the live set, act in it—and so right now I’m at the stage of developing my voice in the genre. I’ll release a concept album or EP of Weekend Warriors before I mount a full production."

Davenport said that he is actively working on a new film project called Tar Baby, "which blends sci-fi [and] horror, film noir, and African-American folklore against the backdrop of the heroin epidemic in West Virginia." Davenport has cast Mya Taylor as the lead and is also collaborating with Marvel illustrator James Rodriguez on a graphic novel adaptation.

Filmography

Recognition

Awards and nominations
NAACP ACT-SO, Winner, Gold Medal: Best Writing, 2000 and 2001
American Gem Short Script Competition, Nomination: Top 100, 2005
LGBT Toronto Film Festival, Winner: Best Ensemble Performance in IT GETS BETTER?, 2017
Independent Music Awards, Winner: Design/Best Publicity Photo - 2018
Citation of Achievement from the Borough of Brooklyn/Office of the President "for being an exceptional actor and entertainer" - September 21, 2018

References

External links

1984 births
Living people
American male screenwriters
African-American film directors
People from Harvey, Illinois
Film directors from Illinois
Screenwriters from Illinois
African-American screenwriters
21st-century African-American people
20th-century African-American people
African-American male writers